Cousin Skeeter is an American children's sitcom, that originally aired on Nickelodeon from 1998 to 2001. It starred Robert Ri'chard as Bobby, a young boy whose life changed when his strange cousin, Skeeter, comes to stay with his family. With Skeeter's help, Bobby learns life lessons and tackles the ups and downs of growing up. The show also included Meagan Good as Bobby's friend Nina, Rondell Sheridan as Bobby's father Andre, and Angela Means as Bobby's mother Vanessa. Skeeter is portrayed by a hand puppet with Bill Bellamy providing his voice, and Drew Massey performing the puppetry, assisted by Alice Dinnean. Within the show, Skeeter is treated like a regular human and no mention of him being a puppet is made. Although the series was shot in a single-camera format, the show used a laugh track.

The show's theme song is an alternate version of 702's 1996 debut single "Steelo", co-written by & featuring Missy Elliott.

Overview 
Cousin Skeeter first aired on September 1, 1998, on Nickelodeon, sharing the 8–9pm programming block with The Wild Thornberrys. Cousin Skeeter was one of many shows at this time to touch on the idea of multicultural themes, with notable shows such as The Brothers García originating around this time as well. The show focused primarily on issues that many African Americans were facing during this time period, by presenting them in a comical way via the use of Skeeter. Skeeter frequently causes mischief, which is often balanced out by Bobby having to correct the situation.

Episodes

Characters

Main 

 Skeeter (performed by Drew Massey, voiced by Bill Bellamy) - Skeeter is the namesake character of the series, a puppet teenage boy whose life changed when he moved from Georgia to New York City to live with his cousin Bobby. He is loud-mouthed, impulsive, and reckless, but an affable, confident, and good-hearted charismatic guy, from instant popular student to charming ladies' man, who spends each episode getting Bobby into trouble trying to help him solve problems and stand up to life's challenges. Skeeter is also friends with several notable celebrities, including Michael Jordan, MC Lyte (whose life he apparently saved), and Dennis Rodman. He's not easily angry, unless someone remarks on his extreme shortness, which causes him to fly into a rage. The fact that he is a puppet is never acknowledged on the series.
 Bobby Walker (portrayed by Robert Ri'chard) - Originally from Inglewood, California. Bobby is smart and well-behaved. Often the victim of his cousin's mischief, Bobby often gets mad at Skeeter for his antics, but Bobby sees the good intentions behind his actions and likes him nonetheless.
 André Walker (portrayed by Rondell Sheridan) - Bobby's father who is a music producer.
 Nina Jones (portrayed by Meagan Good) - Nina is Bobby's best friend. She and Bobby have a crush on each other at the start of the show and later start dating. She is a fast talker and Nicole's best friend.
 Vanessa Walker (portrayed by Angela Means) - Bobby's mother, a lawyer, is often annoyed by Skeeter just like Bobby is. She and Andre can't wait for the boys to go to college, and the couple will do anything to get Skeeter and Bobby out of their hair.

Supporting

 Nicole (voiced by Tisha Campbell) - A female puppet character, Nicole has more class and manners than Skeeter. She first appeared as a new student in the second season's TV movie, "New Kids on the Planet". Nicole quickly became friends with Nina and they are like sisters. She is depicted as tough, once wanting to join the high school football team, and threatening to hurt the school bully if he hurt Skeeter.
 Duke - Bobby's friend Duke appeared in the first and second seasons of the series.
 Geoff - One of Bobby's friends from school, Geoff always seems to be a bad role model for the boys.
 Brenda (portrayed by Lisa "Left Eye" Lopes)

Reception

Critical 

Cousin Skeeter received mixed reviews. A writer from The Hollywood Reporter described the shows characters as "undeveloped" and "dependent on a one-liner approach". Others note that the contrast between Bobby and Skeeter is meant to act as a kind of role model for children, but the message is lost in the strange behavior of Skeeter. Many viewers found it odd that the fact that Skeeter is an actual puppet is never acknowledged by any other characters, which left them to wonder why he was even a puppet in the first place. Ray Richmond, a writer for Variety, found the content borderline offensive, calling it an "a half-hour entrant in Nickelodeon’s primetime "Nickel-O-Zone" lineup" that sends "TVs view of black culture careening back to the Stone Age". However, Rotten Tomatoes rated it as one of five 1990s children's shows that helped "pave the way for black representation on TV", with the article citing the episode "The Bicycle Thief" which tackled the issue of police interacting with black children.

Ratings 

According to a Variety article from February 1999, Cousin Skeeter was "consistently ranked as the top-rated live-action series for the [Nickelodeon] network".

Award and nominations 
 1999
 Young Artist Award nominated for best performance in a TV Drama or Comedy series - Leading Young Actor: Robert Ri'chard
 Outstanding Performance in a Youth or Children's Series/Special: Bill Bellamy
 2000
 Outstanding Youth or Children's Series/Special
 Outstanding Directorial Achievement in Children's Programs: Johnathan Winfrey
 Best Performance in a TV Comedy Series - Guest Starring Young Performer: Rachel Glenn
 Best Performance in a TV Comedy Series - Leading Young Actor: Robert Ri'chard
 2001
 Outstanding Youth or Children's Series/Special
 African American Achievement award for supporting actresses - Rissa JB Milhouse (episode 14)
 Best Performance in a TV Comedy Series - Leading Young Actor: Robert Ri'chard

References 

 Other sources

External links

 

1998 American television series debuts
2001 American television series endings
1990s Nickelodeon original programming
2000s Nickelodeon original programming
1990s American teen sitcoms
2000s American teen sitcoms
1990s American black sitcoms
2000s American black sitcoms
1990s American single-camera sitcoms
2000s American single-camera sitcoms
English-language television shows
Television series about cousins
Television series about families
Television series about teenagers
American television shows featuring puppetry
Television series by Tollin/Robbins Productions
Television series by CBS Studios
Television shows set in New York City
Fictional African-American people